Lester Quiñones (born November 16, 2000) is a Dominican-American professional basketball player for the Golden State Warriors of the National Basketball Association (NBA), on a two-way contract with the Santa Cruz Warriors of the NBA G League. He attended St. Benedict's Preparatory School and played a postgraduate season at IMG Academy. He then played college basketball for the Memphis Tigers.

Early life and high school career
Quiñones grew up in Brentwood, New York and started playing basketball in sixth grade. In his first two years of high school, he attended Brentwood High School. As a junior, Quiñones transferred to Upper Room Christian School in Dix Hills, New York and averaged 19.3 points per game. He was named to the 2017 Long Island Basketball honor roll.

For his senior season, Quiñones moved to St. Benedict's Preparatory School in Newark, New Jersey. He joined a nationally ranked basketball program and became teammates with five-star recruit Precious Achiuwa. On January 7, 2018, Quiñones scored a game-high 23 points in a win over Hudson Catholic Regional High School, the number one team in the NJ.com Top 20 poll. He helped his team to a 28–2 record and a top 10 national ranking by MaxPreps. In the summer, Quiñones played for New Heights alongside Achiuwa, averaging 15.2 points and 4.7 rebounds on the Under Armour Association (UAA) circuit.

Entering the 2018–19 season, he transferred to IMG Academy, a prep school in Bradenton, Florida with a successful basketball program, joining the postgraduate team. Quiñones averaged 24 points, nine rebounds, and six assists per game, shooting 38 percent on three-pointers.

Recruiting
Quiñones finished his high school and postgraduate career as a consensus four-star recruit. On May 10, 2019, he committed to play college basketball for Memphis under head coach Penny Hardaway. He had also strongly considered playing for Indiana.

College career
With James Wiseman sitting out due to eligibility issues, Quiñones had his first double-double on November 16, 2019, recording 21 points and 10 rebounds in a 102–56 win over Alcorn State. As a result, he was named American Athletic Conference freshman of the week on November 18. Quiñones broke his right hand during a November 23 game against Ole Miss and missed three weeks. At the conclusion of the regular season, Quiñones was named to the American Athletic Conference All-Freshman Team. He averaged 10.7 points, 3.8 rebounds and 2.2 assists per game. After his junior season, Quiñones announced his intentions to leave Memphis and enter the 2022 NBA Draft.

Professional career

Santa Cruz Warriors (2022–2023) 
After going undrafted in the 2022 NBA draft, Quiñones signed a two-way contract with the Golden State Warriors on July 5, 2022. Quiñones debuted for the Warriors' 2022 NBA Summer League team in the NBA California Classic, scoring seven points, five rebounds, and two steals in a 68–86 loss to the Sacramento Kings. He was waived by the Warriors on October 13.

On October 15, 2022, Quiñones signed with the Santa Cruz Warriors of the NBA G League. On February 25, 2023, Quiñones had 42 points and 8 rebounds in a 112-119 loss to the Salt Lake City Stars.

On March 2, 2023, Quiñones signed a 10-day contract with the Golden State Warriors, but saw no playing time. He was reacquired by Santa Cruz on March 12.

Golden State Warriors (2023–present) 
On March 17, Quiñones signed a two-way contract with the Golden State Warriors.

National team career
Quiñones is Dominican American and plays for the Dominican Republic national team. He joined the under-18 team at the 2018 FIBA Under-18 Americas Championship in St. Catharines, Ontario. In six games, Quiñones averaged 17.5 points, 6.3 rebounds, and 3.5 assists per game, leading his team to sixth place. His best performance came in a loss to Puerto Rico, in which he recorded 31 points and seven three-pointers.

Personal life
Quiñones is of Dominican descent.

Career statistics

College

|-
| style="text-align:left;"| 2019–20
| style="text-align:left;"| Memphis
| 26 || 23 || 29.4 || .402 || .313 || .804 || 3.8 || 2.2 || .8 || .1 || 10.7
|-
| style="text-align:left;"| 2020–21
| style="text-align:left;"| Memphis
| 28 || 28 || 26.3 || .432 || .400 || .672 || 5.8 || 1.9 || .9 || .2 || 9.5
|-
| style="text-align:left;"| 2021–22
| style="text-align:left;"| Memphis
| 33 || 30 || 27.2 || .449 || .390 || .750 || 3.5 || 1.3 || 1.2 || .1 || 10.0
|- class="sortbottom"
| style="text-align:center;" colspan="2"| Career
| 87 || 81 || 27.6 || .429 || .369 || .752 || 4.3 || 1.8 || .9 || .1 || 10.1

References

External links
Memphis Tigers bio

2000 births
Living people
American sportspeople of Dominican Republic descent
Basketball players from New York (state)
Dominican Republic men's basketball players
Memphis Tigers men's basketball players
People from Brentwood, New York
Santa Cruz Warriors players
Shooting guards
St. Benedict's Preparatory School alumni